Nocardioides daphniae is a gram-positive bacterium from the genus Nocardioides that has been isolated from the water flea Daphnia cucullata from Lake Balaton in Hungary.

References

Further reading

External links
Type strain of Nocardioides daphniae at BacDive -  the Bacterial Diversity Metadatabase	

daphniae
Bacteria described in 2008